Brazde (Furrows) is the second studio album by the Serbian alternative rock band Veliki Prezir, released by B92 in 2001.

Track listing 
All tracks written and arranged by Vladimir Kolarić and Veliki Prezir.

Personnel

Veliki Prezir 
 Vladimir Kolarić — guitar, vocals, acoustic guitar
 Robert Telčer — guitar
 Draga Antov — bass
 Boris Mandić — drums

Additional personnel 
 Alan Smithee Dots — artwork by
 Dušan Ševarlić — backing vocals, arranged by [strings], producer, engineer [post-production], recorded by
 Timea Kalmar — cello
 Branislav Micić — engineer [post-production]
 Milenko Radovanov — photography
 Slobodan Misailović — piano, organ [hammond], percussion, piano [rhodes], recorded by
 Tajj Kvartet — strings
 Jelena Bulatović — viola
 Aleksandra Krčmar — violin
 Jovanka Letić — violin
 Veliki Prezir — producer

References 
 Brazde at Discogs
 EX YU ROCK enciklopedija 1960-2006, Janjatović Petar; 

2001 albums
Veliki Prezir albums
Alternative rock albums by Serbian artists